Autrepierre is a commune in the Meurthe-et-Moselle department in northeastern France.

Population

See also
Communes of the Meurthe-et-Moselle department

References

Communes of Meurthe-et-Moselle